Latur Rural is one of an Assembly Constituency in the Latur.

After the delimitation commission report, the Latur Assembly Constituency was divided in 2008 into Latur City and Latur Rural. They are part of Latur (Lok Sabha constituency).

Geographical Scope
Village list :
Pangaon, 
Renapur,
Bhokrambha,
Shera,
Poharegaon,
Nivada,
Harwadi,
Murud,
Kharola,
Shelu,
Javalga,
Bitargaon,
Samsapur,
Bheta,
Bhopala,
Ekurga,
Bodka,
Ramwadi,
Ghansargaon,
Murdav,
Takalgaon,
Motegaon,
Kamkheda.
Borgaon(N.)

Members of Assembly

Election results

General elections 2019

General elections 2014

General elections 2009

References

Assembly constituencies of Latur district
Latur
Assembly constituencies of Maharashtra